George McClellan Welty (August 25, 1864 – 1942) was an American politician in the state of Washington. He served in the Washington House of Representatives.

References

Members of the Washington House of Representatives
1864 births
1942 deaths
Washington (state) Populists